The South End Historical Society or SEHS, is a non-profit community organization founded in 1966, and dedicated to the preservation of the built environment and revitalization of the South End neighborhood in Boston, Massachusetts, United States. In 1972, the South End neighborhood was placed on the National Register of Historic Places as the largest extant Victorian rowhouse district in the United States. In 1983, the district achieved designation as a Boston Landmark District, by the Boston Landmarks Commission, bringing with it legal protection and public review of alterations to buildings within the district.

Over the course of its existence the SEHS has worked to retain and restore architectural integrity of the South End. The SEHS supports research, conservation, and education to protect and promote interest in the local historic buildings, monuments, and public squares of the South End.

External links
South End Historical Society website

Organizations established in 1966
Culture of Boston
Historic preservation organizations in the United States
History of New England
History of Boston
Heritage organizations
Historical societies in Massachusetts
South End, Boston
1966 establishments in Massachusetts